The Independent Current Coalition is an alliance of political parties contesting the 2014 Egyptian parliamentary election in a joint list with the Egyptian Front, called Egypt.

The alliance was established on 15 June 2014 by the Independent Party Current, which has been active since December 2012. The alliance is also called the Supporting the President coalition. The general coordinator of the alliance is Hamdy al-Fakharany. The coalition is made up of 36 parties.

Affiliated parties
 Democratic Peace Party
 Egyptian Arab Socialist Party
 Revolutionary Forces Bloc

References

2014 establishments in Egypt
Political party alliances in Egypt
Organizations established in 2014